There are ten stadiums in use by Pacific Coast League (PCL) baseball teams. The oldest stadium is Cheney Stadium, home of the Tacoma Rainiers, which opened in 1959. The newest stadium is Las Vegas Ballpark, home of the Las Vegas Aviators, which opened in 2019. One stadium was built in the 1950s, two in the 1990s, four in the 2000s, and three in the 2010s. The highest seating capacity of all active stadiums is 14,511, at Smith's Ballpark where the Salt Lake Bees play. The lowest capacity is Tacoma's Cheney Stadium, with 6,500 seats. All stadiums use a grass surface.

From the PCL's foundation in 1903, its teams played at some 72 stadiums located among 45 municipalities across the United States and in Canada.

Active stadiums
{|class="wikitable sortable plainrowheaders"
!scope="col"|Name
!scope="col"|Team
!scope="col"|City
!scope="col"|State
!scope="col"|Opened
!scope="col"|Capacity
!scope="col" class="unsortable"|
|-
!scope="row"|Cheney Stadium
|Tacoma Rainiers
|Tacoma
|Washington
|align="right"|1959
|align="right"|6,500
|align="center"|
|-
!scope="row"|Chickasaw Bricktown Ballpark
|Oklahoma City Dodgers
|Oklahoma City
|Oklahoma
|align="right"|1998
|align="right"|9,000
|align="center"|
|-
!scope="row"|Constellation Field
|Sugar Land Space Cowboys
|Sugar Land
|Texas
|align="right"|2012
|align="right"|7,500
|align="center"|
|-
!scope="row"|Dell Diamond
|Round Rock Express
|Round Rock
|Texas
|align="right"|2000
|align="right"|11,631
|align="center"|
|-
!scope="row"|Greater Nevada Field
|Reno Aces
|Reno
|Nevada
|align="right"|2009
|align="right"|9,013
|align="center"|
|-
!scope="row"|Las Vegas Ballpark
|Las Vegas Aviators
|Las Vegas
|Nevada
|align="right"|2019
|align="right"|10,000
|align="center"|
|-
!scope="row"|Rio Grande Credit Union Field at Isotopes Park
|Albuquerque Isotopes
|Albuquerque
|New Mexico
|align="right"|2003
|align="right"|13,500
|align="center"|
|-
!scope="row"|Smith's Ballpark
|Salt Lake Bees
|Salt Lake City
|Utah
|align="right"|1994
|align="right"|14,511
|align="center"|
|-
!scope="row"|Southwest University Park
|El Paso Chihuahuas
|El Paso
|Texas
|align="right"|2014
|align="right"|9,500
|align="center"|
|-
!scope="row"|Sutter Health Park
|Sacramento River Cats
|Sacramento
|California
|align="right"|2000
|align="right"|14,014
|align="center"|
|}

Map

Gallery

Former stadiums

Unknown stadiums
No information is available as to the ballparks of these teams in these seasons.

Map

See also
List of American Association (1902–1997) stadiums
List of International League stadiums
List of Major League Baseball stadiums
List of Triple-A baseball stadiums

Notes

References

External links

Digitalballparks.com's photographic history of Pacific Coast League ballparks since 1903

Pacific Coast League stadiums
Pacific Coast League stadiums